This is a List of fictional werewolves who appear in works of literature, television, comics, films and legends.

Literature

Film

Television

Animation

Comics

Video games

See also
 Werewolf fiction

References

Further reading

Fictional werewolves
Fictional hybrid life forms
werewolves